The 44th Annual Japan Record Awards took place on December 31, 2002, starting at 6:00PM JST. The primary ceremonies were televised in Japan on TBS.

Award winners 
Japan Record Award:
Max Matsuura (producer), CREA + D・A・I (composer) & Ayumi Hamasaki (songwriter, singer) for "Voyage"
Best Vocalist:
Ryoko Moriyama
Best New Artist:
Mika Nakashima

External links
Official Website

Japan Record Awards
Japan Record Awards
Japan Record Awards
Japan Record Awards
2002